Rezu may refer to:
 Rezu, Japanese lesbianism in erotica
 Rezu, Iran, a village in Kerman Province, Iran
 Rezu Sofla, a village in Razavi Khorasan Province, Iran